Broxburn Academy is a secondary school in Broxburn, West Lothian, Scotland.

Notable alumni
Hannah Bardell – Scottish National Party MP for Livingston (2015–present)
Sir Alexander Haddow – Physician and pathologist
Chris Lilley – Computer scientist
Graeme Morrice – Former Labour Party MP for Livingston (2010-2015), who was unseated by Bardell at the 2015 UK general election.

Catchment area
Associated Primary Schools: Broxburn Primary, Kirkhill Primary, Uphall Primary, Pumpherston & Uphall Station Community Primary. (Pupils occasionally come from St. Nicholas Roman Catholic Primary and Winchburgh Primary)

References

External links
Official School Website

Secondary schools in West Lothian
Broxburn, West Lothian
1962 establishments in Scotland
Educational institutions established in 1962